Agaton Giller (Opatówek, Congress Poland, Russian Empire, 1831 – 1887, Stanisławów, Austro-Hungary) was a Polish historian, journalist and politician. He and his brother Stefan Giller played notable roles in the Polish independence movement and in the January 1863 Uprising.

Life
He was a participant in the January Uprising and was one of the leaders of the "Red" faction among the insurrectionists as a member of the Central National Committee (Komitet Centralny Narodowy) and the Provisional National Government (Tymczasowy Rząd Narodowy). After being exiled to Siberia by the Imperial Russian authorities, he became the first Siberian historian and biographer of other deported Poles.

Later, in exile in Paris, he was a journalist with such periodicals as Ojczyzna (The Fatherland) and Kurier Paryski (The Paris Courier), a founder of Polish self-assistance organizations, and a founder of the Polish National Museum in Rapperswil, in Switzerland's Canton of St. Gallen.

He wrote many historical and biographical works, articles and studies.

He died in 1887 in Stanisławów. In 1980 his grave was repatriated from the closed Ivano-Frankivsk cemetery to Warsaw's Powązki Cemetery.

Legacy
The Polish National Alliance, in the United States, considers Agaton Giller its "spiritual father."

See also
List of Poles

References

External links

 
Polish Museum (Polish Museum Rapperswil)
Opatówek history - on The Giller Brothers' Communal Public Library in Opatówek page

1831 births
1887 deaths
People from Kalisz County
Burials at Powązki Cemetery
19th-century Polish historians
Polish male non-fiction writers
Polish journalists
Polish politicians
January Uprising participants
Members of Polish government (January Uprising)
Polish exiles in the Russian Empire
People from Rapperswil-Jona
19th-century Polish journalists
Male journalists
19th-century male writers